Wildwood House in Ferguson, Missouri is an Italianate style house built in 1857.  It was listed on the National Register of Historic Places in 2006.

It is a two-story,  brick masonry Italianate house.  It was built for Major Joseph LaMotte and his wife Ellen Chambers LaMotte, to serve as a country showplace home.  The Hartnett Place subdivision was
built around it in 1956.

References

Ferguson, Missouri
Houses on the National Register of Historic Places in Missouri
Italianate architecture in Missouri
Houses completed in 1857
Houses in St. Louis County, Missouri
National Register of Historic Places in St. Louis County, Missouri
1857 establishments in Missouri